The Whirlpool is a novel by English author George Gissing, first published in 1897.

Further reading

 Baubles Jr., Raymond L. (2001). "The Bankruptcies of the Nation in Meredith's One of Our Conquerors and Gissing's The Whirlpool." In: A Garland for Gissing. Amsterdam: Rodopi, pp. 261–270.
 Fernando, Loyd (1981). "Gissing Studies in 'Vulgarism': Aspects of his Anti-Feminism." In: George Gissing: Critical Essays. London: Vision Press.
 Garland, Hamlin (1898). "George Gissing's 'Whirlpool'," The Book Buyer, Vol. XVI, pp. 38–40.
 Greenslade, William (1989). "Women and the Disease of Civilization: George Gissing's 'The Whirlpool'," Victorian Studies, Vol. XXXII, No. 4, pp. 507–523.
 James, Henry (1897). "London, July 1, 1897," Harper's Weekly, Vol. XLI, No. 2119, p. 754 (rep. with very slight changes in Notes on Novelists. New York: Charles Scribner's Sons, 1914, pp. 436–445).
 O'Sullivan, Vincent (1927). "More About Gissing," The Saturday Review, Vol. IV, p. 26. 
 Parrinder, Patrick (1977). Introduction to The Whirlpool. Rutherford, N.J.: Fairleigh Dickinson University Press.
 Peck, Harry Thurston (1898). "The Whirlpool," The Bookman, Vol. VII, pp. 64–66.

External links
 The Whirlpool, at Internet Archive
 The Whirlpool, at Hathi Trust
 The Whirlpool, at Project Gutenberg

1897 British novels
Novels by George Gissing
Victorian novels
Novels set in England
Novels set in the 19th century